Francis Charles Gaudion (22 June 1882 – 12 July 1952) was an Australian rules footballer who played with Collingwood in the Victorian Football League (VFL).

Notes

External links 

Frank Gaudion's profile at Collingwood Forever

1882 births
1952 deaths
Australian rules footballers from Melbourne
Collingwood Football Club players
People from Port Melbourne